Gatersleben is a village and a former municipality in the district Salzlandkreis, in Saxony-Anhalt, Germany. Since 1 September 2010, it is part of the town Seeland. It is situated southwest of Magdeburg and northwest of Halle (Saale).

Economy

Agriculture and Biotechnology are the two major focus areas to promote economic development in and around the village. The Biotechpark Gatersleben, developed at the initiative of the State of Saxony-Anhalt, provides space to growing biotech companies. The Leibniz-Institute of Plant Genetics and Crop Plant Research IPK (http://www.ipk-gatersleben.de]), Gatersleben, is a nonprofit research institution for crop genetics and molecular biology, and is part of the Leibniz Association.

At present, Gatersleben is rapidly becoming a center for “green” biotechnology. The establishment of SunGene, a plant biotechnology company and subsidiary of the BASF group, provided the principal impetus in 1998 . Today, SunGene is a part of the BASF Plant Science organisation and has more than 60 employees and an ideal research environment in a modern laboratory building. Three other biotech firms, hived off from the IPK, work in a business centre completed in autumn 2000: TraitGenetics, Novoplant, and ArrayOn. Plantalytics GmbH, a small service company for photosynthetic metering, also operates on the campus.

Due to major structural problems of Saxony-Anhalt such as a high rate of unemployment Gatersleben with its biotech-park is of great importance to develop that area.

G-Life

Gatersleben combines the rural village life in the plains of the Harz with an international community, creating a culture known as G-Life. The internationally known Leibniz-Institute of Plant Genetics and Crop Plant Research, IPK (http://www.ipk-gatersleben.de), IPK-Gatersleben, together with the associated biotechnology companies, attracts a diverse community from around Germany, Europe, and the World.

Transport

The major local mode of transport is bus and train. The fares depend on the distance and region of travel.

Occasional buses in the village are connecting to nearby town and villages and run by QBUS.

Both the national Deutsche Bahn DB regional train service and the local Harz Elbe Express (HEX Online), provide service to Gatersleben. The train service connects Halle to the southeast and to northwest the HEX makes connections through Halberstadt while the regional service from DB connects through Hannover.
The nearest airport is Magdeburg-Cochstedt Airport, located only 7 km of village.
The nearest major airport is Leipzig/Halle Airport, located around 90 km south of village.

In and around the village

Gatersleben is a small village with a traditional restaurant/pub, a bank, a post office, a supermarket, a hardware store, and a drugstore.

The nice landscape of the village is worth watching during different seasons. Gatersleben is surrounded by beautiful towns like Wernigrode, Quedlinburg etc.

References

Former municipalities in Saxony-Anhalt
Seeland, Germany